Rhinotyphlops ataeniatus is a species of snake in the family Typhlopidae. The species is endemic to the Horn of Africa.

Geographic range
R. ataeniatus is found in eastern Ethiopia, northeastern Kenya, and Somalia.

References

Further reading
Boulenger GA (1912). "Missione per la Frontiera Italo-Etiopica sotto il commando del Capitano Carlo Citerni - Risultati zoologici - list of the Reptiles and Batrachians". Annali del Museo Civico di Storia Naturale di Genova, Third Series, 5: 329–332. (Typhlops unitaeniatus var. ataeniatus, new variation, p. 331). (in English).

Typhlopidae
Reptiles described in 1912